Anolis prasinorius, the Baoruco green twig anole, is a species of lizard in the family Dactyloidae. The species is found in the Dominican Republic.

References

Anoles
Reptiles described in 2016
Endemic fauna of the Dominican Republic
Reptiles of the Dominican Republic
Taxa named by Gunther Köhler
Taxa named by Stephen Blair Hedges